Evolution (stylized as EVØLUTION) is the third studio album by the American electronic rock band Ghost Town. It was released on November 6, 2015 through Fueled by Ramen.

The first single from the album, "Spark", was released on October 16, 2015. The second single, "Mean Kids", Released On The Same Day, October 16, 2015, "Loner", was premiered exclusively on Billboard on October 22, 2015, but the track will not be released as a single.

Background
In July 2015, Evan Pearce, former producer for the band, announced his departure from Ghost Town due to undisclosed health reasons. In the press release, the band announced they would continue as a trio.

Evolution was announced on their Facebook page on September 10, 2015, a day prior to the release of the music video for the first single off the album, "Spark". The album was recorded at Pulse Studios in Spring of 2015 with Josh Abraham, Nico Stadi, Oligee, and Ryan Williams over a span of 6 weeks. A music video for their second single, "Loner" was released alongside the album.

The album, according to Kevin Ghost, has a different message than the band's previous works.

The second single off of the album, "Mean Kids", focuses on the subject of bullying. On October 22, 2015, "Loner" was available for preview in an article on Billboard. The band called this song "the loner anthem for our generation."

Track listing

References

Ghost Town (band) albums
2015 albums